Joanna "Jo" Stone-Nixon (born 4 October 1972 in London, England) is a retired javelin thrower, who represented Australia twice at the Summer Olympics, starting in 1996. She is best known for winning the silver medal at the 1997 World Championships in Athens, Greece. Stone was the appellant in an important High Court of Australia case on taxation law, Federal Commissioner of Taxation v Stone (2005) 59 ATR 50.

Stone-Nixon is now mother of two children, Ella Jane Nixon and James Edward Nixon. Her sporting courier ended in early 2001, after her performance in the Sydney Olympic games in 2000, with a final throw of 54.34 metres.

Achievements

References

 Joanna Stone-Nixon at Australian Athletics Historical Results

External links
 
 
 
 
 
 

1972 births
Living people
Australian female javelin throwers
Athletes (track and field) at the 1994 Commonwealth Games
Athletes (track and field) at the 1998 Commonwealth Games
Athletes (track and field) at the 1996 Summer Olympics
Athletes (track and field) at the 2000 Summer Olympics
Olympic athletes of Australia
Athletes from London
World Athletics Championships medalists
Goodwill Games medalists in athletics
Competitors at the 1998 Goodwill Games
Commonwealth Games competitors for Australia